State Route 187 (SR 187) is a 7.8 mile long east-west state highway in Gibson County, Tennessee

Route description

SR 187 begins just outside the Humboldt city limits at an intersection with US 70A/US 79/SR 76. It goes east through rural farmland to have a short concurrency with SR 186 just south of the town of Gibson. It continues east, then northeast, through farmland and rural areas to enter the Milan city limits, where it passes through some industrial areas before SR 187 comes to an end at an intersection with US 45E/SR 43 just south of downtown. The entire route of SR 187 is a two-lane highway.

Major intersections

References

187
Transportation in Gibson County, Tennessee